The Syrian Penal Code is the current statutory criminal code of Syria. It was promulgated in 1949 and enacted on 22 June 1949. The criminal code consists of 756 articles.

Structure

General Provisions (articles 1-259 of the Criminal Code) 
Book One:

 Penal Code (articles 1-36 of the Criminal Code)
 In Penal Provisions (articles 37-177 of the Criminal Code)
 In Crime (articles 178-208 of the Criminal Code)
 Responsibility (articles 209-259 of the Criminal Code)

Crimes (articles 260-532 of the Criminal Code) 
Book Two:

 Crimes against state security (articles 260-311 of the Criminal Code)
 Crimes against public safety (articles 312-339 of the Criminal Code)
 Crimes against the public administration (articles 340-387 of the Criminal Code)
 Crimes against the judicial administration (articles 388-426 of the Criminal Code)
 Crimes against public trust (articles 427-461 of the Criminal Code)
 Crimes affecting religion and family (articles 462-488 of the Criminal Code)
 Crimes against morality and public morals (articles 489-532 of the Criminal Code)

Trust and Misdemeanors (articles 533-756 of the Criminal Code) 
Book Three:

 Crimes and misdemeanors that benefit people (articles 533-572 of the Criminal Code)
 Crimes that constitute a comprehensive threat (articles 573-595 of the Criminal Code)
 Crimes committed by people who are dangerous because of their lifestyle (articles 596-620 of the Criminal Code)
 Crimes against money (articles 621-735 of the Criminal Code)
 Coagulants (articles 736-756 of the Criminal Code)

See also 

 Judiciary of Syria
 Constitution of Syria
 People's Council of Syria

References

External links 
 Official Arabic Penal Code:
 Syrian Penal Code
 Syrian Penal Code Files

Penal code
Law of Syria
1949 establishments in Syria
1949 in law